Benzyl chloride, or α-chlorotoluene, is an organic compound with the formula C6H5CH2Cl. This colorless liquid is a reactive organochlorine compound that is a widely used chemical building block.

Preparation
Benzyl chloride is prepared industrially by the gas-phase photochemical reaction of toluene with chlorine:
C6H5CH3 + Cl2 → C6H5CH2Cl + HCl
In this way, approximately 100,000 tonnes are produced annually. The reaction proceeds by the free radical process, involving the intermediacy of free chlorine atoms. Side products of the reaction include benzal chloride and benzotrichloride.

Other methods of production exist, such as the Blanc chloromethylation of benzene. Benzyl chloride was first prepared from treatment of benzyl alcohol with hydrochloric acid.

Uses and reactions
Industrially, benzyl chloride is the precursor to benzyl esters, which are used as plasticizers, flavorants, and perfumes. Phenylacetic acid, a precursor to pharmaceuticals, is produced from benzyl cyanide, which in turn is generated by treatment of benzyl chloride with sodium cyanide. Quaternary ammonium salts, used as surfactants, are readily formed by alkylation of tertiary amines with benzyl chloride.  

Benzyl ethers are often derived from benzyl chloride.  Benzyl chloride reacts with aqueous sodium hydroxide to give dibenzyl ether.  In organic synthesis, benzyl chloride is used to introduce the benzyl protecting group in reaction with alcohols, yielding the corresponding benzyl ether, carboxylic acids, and benzyl ester. 

Benzoic acid (C6H5COOH) can be prepared by oxidation of benzyl chloride in the presence of alkaline KMnO4:
C6H5CH2Cl + 2 KOH + 2 [O] → C6H5COOK + KCl + H2O

Benzyl chloride may be used in the synthesis of amphetamine-class drugs, and for this reason, sales of benzyl chloride are monitored as a List II drug precursor chemical by the US Drug Enforcement Administration.

Benzyl chloride also reacts readily with metallic magnesium to produce a Grignard reagent. It is preferable over benzyl bromide for the preparation of this reagent, since the reaction of the bromide with magnesium tends to form the Wurtz coupling product 1,2-diphenylethane.

Safety
Benzyl chloride is an alkylating agent. Indicative of its high reactivity (relative to alkyl chlorides), benzyl chloride reacts with water in a hydrolysis reaction to form benzyl alcohol and hydrochloric acid. In contact with mucous membranes, hydrolysis produces hydrochloric acid. Thus, benzyl chloride is a lachrymator and has been used in chemical warfare. It is also very irritating to the skin.

It is classified as an extremely hazardous substance in the United States as defined in Section 302 of the U.S. Emergency Planning and Community Right-to-Know Act (42 U.S.C. 11002), and is subject to strict reporting requirements by facilities which produce, store, or use it in significant quantities.

See also
 Benzyl bromide
 Benzyl fluoride
 Benzyl iodide
 List of highly toxic gases

References

External links

CDC - NIOSH Pocket Guide for Chemical Hazards - Benzyl chloride

Organochlorides
Lachrymatory agents
IARC Group 2A carcinogens
Benzyl compounds